Tamar Sam-Ash (AKA Tamar Samash) served from 2015 to 2018 as Israeli Ambassador to Romania. She was ambassador to Belgium from 2007 until 2011, concurrently serving as the non-resident ambassador to Luxembourg.  She was also Consul General of Israel in Marseille, France (1999-2003).

Education
1969: Sorbonne University (Paris), French Culture Specialization
1971 – 1974: Hebrew University of Jerusalem, BA Bible studies and French literature
1977: Hebrew University Jerusalem, MA French literature and civilization

References

Ambassadors of Israel to Belgium
Ambassadors of Israel to Luxembourg
Ambassadors of Israel to Romania
Israeli women ambassadors
Israeli consuls
Paris-Sorbonne University alumni
Hebrew University of Jerusalem alumni
Year of birth missing (living people)
Living people